RNA-binding motif, single-stranded-interacting protein 1 is a protein that in humans is encoded by the RBMS1 gene.

Function 

This gene encodes a member of a small family of proteins which bind single stranded DNA/RNA. These proteins are characterized by the presence of two sets of ribonucleoprotein consensus sequence (RNP-CS) that contain conserved motifs, RNP1 and RNP2, originally described in RNA binding proteins, and required for DNA binding. These proteins have been implicated in such diverse functions as DNA replication, gene transcription, cell cycle progression and apoptosis. Multiple transcript variants, resulting from alternative splicing and encoding different isoforms, have been described. Several of these were isolated by virtue of their binding to either strand of an upstream element of c-myc (MSSPs), or by phenotypic complementation of cdc2 and cdc13 mutants of yeast (scr2), or as a potential human repressor of HIV-1 and ILR-2 alpha promoter transcription (YC1). A pseudogene for this locus is found on chromosome 12.

Interactions 

RBMS1 has been shown to interact with Polymerase (DNA directed), alpha 1.

References

Further reading